Pittosporum pauciflorum is a species of plant in the Pittosporaceae family. It is endemic to China.

References

pauciflorum
Endemic flora of China
Threatened flora of Asia
Vulnerable plants
Taxonomy articles created by Polbot